The men's 300 m rifle three positions was a shooting sports event held as part of the Shooting at the 1948 Summer Olympics programme. It was the fifth appearance of the event at an Olympic Games. The competition was held on 5 and 6 August 1948, with 36 shooters from 13 nations competing. Each nation was limited to three shooters. The event was won by Emil Grünig of Switzerland, the nation's first victory in the event since 1900 and second overall (the first nation to win two gold medals in the event). Silver went to Pauli Janhonen of Finland and bronze to Willy Røgeberg of Norway.

Background
This was the fifth appearance of the men's 300 metre three-positions rifle event, which was held 11 times between 1900 and 1972. It was being held for the first time since 1920, after being left off the programme in 1924, 1932, and 1936 (no shooting events were held in 1928). Pauli Janhonen of Finland was the reigning world champion; third-place finisher Otto Horber also competed in London 1948.

Argentina, Australia, Iran, Mexico, and Peru made their debut in the event. Denmark, France, and Norway each made their fifth appearance, the only nations to have competed at every appearance of the event to date.

Competition format

The competition had each shooter fire 120 shots, 40 shots in each of three positions: prone, kneeling, and standing. Shots were first in series of 10. Time was limited to 2 hours for each of the prone and keeling positions and 2.5 hours for standing. The target was 1 metre in diameter, with 10 scoring rings; targets were set at a distance of 300 metres. Thus, the maximum score possible was 1200 points. Any rifle up to 9mm caliber could be used, though optical glasses on the rifles were forbidden and the total weight (including accessories) was limited to 9 kilograms. Shooters had to use the same caliber rifle for each position.

Records

Prior to the competition, the existing world and Olympic records were as follows.

The top 23 shooters in 1948 broke the Olympic record, which had been uncontested in 28 years. Emil Grünig ended with the new record, at 1120 points.

Schedule

All times are British Summer Time (UTC+1)

Results

References

Shooting at the 1948 Summer Olympics
Men's 300m 3 positions